Fulani may refer to:

 pertaining to the Fulani Empire
 pertaining to the Fulani War
 Yasir Al-Fulani, a character from Call of Duty 4: Modern Warfare
 Ethnic group and language
 Fula people (autonym Fulɓe)
 Hausa-Fulani, a larger grouping which the Fulani belong to
 Fula language or Fulfulde language
 People (proper name)
 Dan Fulani, nom de plume used by John Hare as a Nigerian author
 Lenora Fulani, an American psychologist, psychotherapist, and political activist.
 Fulani cattle
 Red Fulani cattle
 White Fulani cattle

See also
 Fula (disambiguation)
 Fula jihads
 Fulani Caliph
 List of placeholder names by language in Arabic